Priscila Perales (born Silvia Priscila Perales Elizondo; February 24, 1983 in Monterrey, Nuevo León, Mexico) is a Mexican actress, spokesperson, beauty queen, author and former model. She was crowned Nuestra Belleza México 2005 (Miss Mexico). She was a top ten finalist in the Miss Universe 2006 pageant. The following year, she became the first Mexican to win the title of Miss International in 2007.

After competing in beauty pageants, Priscila debuted as an actress in Hispanic soap operas with Univision and Telemundo television networks in Miami, Florida where she currently resides. She retired from modeling in 2014 and married race car driver Adrián Fernández in 2018.

Early life
Priscila Perales was born in Monterrey, Nuevo León, Mexico to Mexican parents Jesús Perales and Sylvia Elizondo. She has a younger brother, Jesus Perales Elizondo. She was raised in the neighborhood of San Pedro Garza García where she lived until 2008. She studied elementary, middle school and high school in the American School Foundation of Monterrey (ASFM). As a teen she did local modeling and studied a Communications Major in the University of Monterrey (UDEM) falling one semester short of graduating, given she won the Miss Mexico title in 2005 and moved to Mexico City for training, in preparation for the Miss Universe pageant.

Pageant career
Priscila began competing in beauty pageants at the age of 21 in her hometown of Monterrey. She won her first title of Nuestra Belleza Nuevo León 2005 on July 11, 2005, which led her to compete nationally for the Miss Mexico title. On September 2, 2005, she went on to win the title of Nuestra Belleza México 2005 in Aguascalientes, Aguascalientes, Mexico giving her the right to represent her country in the 55th edition of the Miss Universe 2006 pageant held at the Shrine Auditorium in Los Angeles, California on July 23, 2006. Perales made it to the top ten finalists in the Miss Universe competition.

A year later, she competed once again in the international scene, representing her country in the 47th edition of the Miss International 2007 beauty pageant. Priscila became the first Mexican to win this title, beating out the 61 other contestants from all over the world on October 15, 2007, at The Prince Park Tower in Minato, Tokyo, Japan. She is also the second Mexican woman to win all mayor international beauty pageants after Lupita Jones in Miss Universe 1991 after 16 years.

Acting career
Before pursuing an acting career, Priscila worked as a news anchor in Televisa Monterrey (Grupo Televisa). Later, she studied acting in a UCLA Extension program in Los Angeles, California in 2009. After a year of studying and casting for acting roles, she was offered her acting debut in the Hispanic soap opera Eva Luna produced by the Univision and Venevision TV networks in 2010 in Miami, Florida where she moved to start her acting career. After her successful role in this production, Priscila remained in Miami as she was offered more TV roles in Telemundo TV series productions such as Corazon Valiente portraying the character of Nelly Balbuena, Pasion Prohibida portraying the character of Eliana Ramírez, and Reina de Corazones portraying the character of Delfina Ortiz.

Personal life

After almost five years of acting in television productions, Priscila decided to retire to pursue other interests and got certified as a holistic nutritionist by the Institute for Integrative Nutrition (IIN) in 2015. Also, she has always been an avid writer, publishing her first book Priscila, Queen of My Destiny in 2012 and published her second book Trascendent Love: A Metaphysical Perspective in 2018.

She met longtime boyfriend, the retired race car driver Adrián Fernández, on November 1, 2012, through a mutual friend in Miami, Florida and they got married later in Miami Beach, Florida (May 4, 2018). The couple live in Miami with their son Adrián Fernández Jr. born on October 29, 2020. Currently, Priscila is dedicated to her family and shares holistic lifestyle videos too.

Filmography

Film

Television

Books

References

External links
Crowning of Priscila Perales as Miss International 2007
All the winners of the contest Miss International
Priscila, Queen Of My Destiny
Movie The Avenger

Living people
21st-century Mexican actresses
Miss International winners
Miss International 2007 delegates
Miss Universe 2006 contestants
Nuestra Belleza México winners
Beauty pageant contestants from Monterrey
Mexican beauty pageant winners
Mexican telenovela actresses
Actresses from Monterrey
Mexican female models
Racing drivers' wives and girlfriends
1983 births